The Macedonian Women's Basketball Cup is the national women's basketball cup of North Macedonia. It has been played for since 1992.

History

Cup winners

Performance by club

External links
 Profile at eurobasket.com

Cup
Cup
Macedonia
Recurring sporting events established in 1992
1992 establishments in the Republic of Macedonia